The 2011–12 Tom Tomsk season was the 7th straight season that the club was play in the Russian Premier League, the highest tier of football in Russia.

Current squad
Updated 25 February 2012.

Transfers

Winter

In:

Out:

Summer

In:

Out:

Winter

In:

Out:

Competitions

Russian Premier League

Results

Table

Russian Premier League – relegation group

Results by round

Matches

League table

Russian Cup

Squad statistics

Appearances and goals

|-
|colspan="14"|Players away from the club on loan:

|-
|colspan="14"|Players who appeared for Tom Tomsk that left during the season:

|}

Top scorers

Disciplinary record

References

FC Tom Tomsk seasons
Tom Tomsk